Sinopa ("swift fox") is a genus of hyaenodontid mammal from family Sinopidae, that lived in North America and Asia during the early to middle Eocene.

Description
Sinopa was a small genus of hyaenodontid mammals. Its carnassial teeth were the second upper molar and the lower third. Sinopa species had an estimated weight of 1.33 to 13.97 kilograms. The type specimen was found in the Bridger formation in Uinta County, Wyoming,  and existed 50.3 to 46.2 million years ago.

Taxonomy
The putative African species "Sinopa" ethiopica from Egypt was considered a species of Metasinopa by Savage (1965), although Holroyd (1994) considered it a potential new genus related to Quasiapterodon.

Phylogeny
The phylogenetic relationships of genus Sinopa are shown in the following cladogram.

See also
 Mammal classification
 Sinopidae

References

Hyaenodonts
Eocene mammals of North America
Eocene United States
Eocene genus first appearances
Fossil taxa described in 1871
Prehistoric placental genera